The Cadillac micropolitan area is a micropolitan statistical area (μSA) defined by the United States Census Bureau as an area encompassing two counties (Missaukee and Wexford) in the U.S. state of Michigan. The population of the μSA was 48,725 at the 2020 census (33,673 in Wexford County and 15,052 in Missaukee County).

The principal city of the μSA is Cadillac, which had a population of 10,371 at the 2020 census.

Counties
Missaukee County
Wexford County

Incorporated municipalities

Cities
Cadillac
Lake City
Manton
McBain

Villages
Buckley
Harrietta
Mesick

Townships

Charter township
Haring Charter Township

Civil townships

Aetna Township
Antioch Township
Bloomfield Township
Boon Township
Butterfield Township
Caldwell Township
Cedar Creek Township
Cherry Grove Township
Clam Lake Township
Clam Union Township
Colfax Township
Enterprise Township
Forest Township
Greenwood Township
Hanover Township
Henderson Township
Holland Township
Lake Township
Liberty Township
Norwich Township
Pioneer Township
Reeder Township
Richland Township
Riverside Township
Selma Township
Slagle Township
South Branch Township
Springville Township
West Branch Township
Wexford Township

Unincorporated communities

Census-designated places
 Boon
 Caberfae
 Falmouth
 Haring
 Jennings
 Wedgewood

Other unincorporated communities

 Arlene
 Axin
 Bagnall
 Baxter
 Benson
 Butterfield
 Cutcheon
 Dinca
 Dolph
 Garletts Corner
 Gilbert
 Glengary
 Harlan
 Hobart
 Hoxeyville
 Keelans Corner
 Lucas
 Meauwataka
 Merritt
 Millersville
 Missaukee Junction
 Moddersville
 Moorestown
 Morey
 Pioneer
 Prosper
 Sherman
 Star City
 Stittsville
 Stoney Corner
 Vogel Center
 Walton
 Wexford Corner
 Yuma

Ghost towns

 Angola
 Bond's Mill
 Bunyea
 Cherry Grove
 Claggettville
 Coline
 Elton
 Haire
 Mystic
 Round Lake
 Soper
 Thorp
 Wexford

See also
 List of census-designated places in Michigan
 List of municipalities in Michigan
 Michigan statistical areas

References

 
Geography of Missaukee County, Michigan
Geography of Wexford County, Michigan